Miss Teen USA 2003, the 21st Miss Teen USA pageant, was televised live from Palm Springs Convention Center, Palm Springs, California on 12 August 2003.  At the conclusion of the final competition, Miss Oregon Teen USA Tami Farrell was crowned by outgoing queen Vanessa Semrow of Wisconsin.

Prior to the live telecast, the 51 contestants competed in a preliminary presentation show where they were judged in swimsuits and evening gowns. Scores from this judging determined the top 15 for the final competition.

This was the first year that the pageant was held in Palm Springs, which would later host Miss Teen USA 2004 and Miss Teen USA 2006. The pageant location was announced on 17 July 2003.  On 23 July 2003 it was announced that Jessica Simpson and Justin Guarini would appear as musical guests during the pageant.  The event was hosted by Mario Lopez and Brooke Burns.

Farrell was the third titleholder from Oregon, the only state to win more than one Miss Teen USA title, other than Tennessee (who won in 2009) and their 1997 win.

Results

Placements

Awards

Delegates
The Miss Teen USA 2003 delegates were:

 Alabama - Katherine Lauren Whitlock
 Alaska - Brittany Ann Jackson
 Arizona - Natalia Benenson
 Arkansas - Brittany Carpenter
 California - Shannon Byrne
 Colorado - Karis Donahue
 Connecticut - Nina Musumeci
 Delaware - Ashley James
 District of Columbia - Natasha Prakash
 Florida - Mary Jeffords
 Georgia - Cassady Lance
 Hawaii - Camille Peraro
 Idaho - Amanda Rammell
 Illinois - Tiffiney McCormick
 Indiana - Jami Stallings
 Iowa - Alyssa Cook
 Kansas - Megan Price
 Kentucky - Amanda Nunnelley
 Louisiana - Megan Bologna
 Maine - Ashley Alden
 Maryland - Courtney Hejl
 Massachusetts - Jacqueline Bruno
 Michigan - Alicia Jaros
 Minnesota - Kristin Swoboda
 Mississippi - Krisi Nash
 Missouri - Amber Seyer
 Montana - Arielle Brown
 Nebraska - Leighann Thagard
 Nevada - Ashley Phelps
 New Hampshire - Marshele Lee
 New Jersey - Jacklyn Pezzotta
 New Mexico - Courtney Clayshulte
 New York -  Adriana Diaz
 North Carolina - Erin Hendricks
 North Dakota - Marisa Field
 Ohio - Amanda Stevens
 Oklahoma - Nikki Carver
 Oregon - Tami Farrell
 Pennsylvania - Taylor Baker
 Rhode Island - Kristina Primavera 
 South Carolina - Stephanie Horton
 South Dakota - Nicole Cuppy
 Tennessee - Alicia Selby
 Texas - Tye Felan
 Utah - Jessica Dawn Black
 Vermont - Jenna Lajeunesse
 Virginia - Amber Copley
 Washington - Jasmine Jorgensen
 West Virginia - Whitney Veach
 Wisconsin - Jenna Tighe
 Wyoming - Kasi Johnston

Crossovers
Ten contestants later won or held Miss USA state titles:
Adriana Diaz (New York) - Miss New York USA 2006
Amber Copley (Virginia) - Miss Virginia USA 2006
Jami Stallings (Indiana) - Miss Indiana USA 2007
Amanda Rammell (Idaho) - Miss Idaho USA 2007
Amber Seyer (Missouri) - Miss Missouri USA 2007 (top ten at Miss USA 2007)
Jacqueline Bruno (Massachusetts) - Miss Massachusetts USA 2008 (top ten at Miss USA 2008)
Tami Farrell (Oregon) - Miss California USA 2009 (assumed title after the dethronement of its original titleholder, Carrie Prejean)
Kristina Primavera (Rhode Island) - Miss Rhode Island USA 2010
Cassady Lance (Georgia) - Miss Georgia USA 2010
Whitney Veach (West Virginia) - Miss West Virginia USA 2011

Notable features
Maine made the semi-finals for the first time since 1995.  This was only the third time that Maine made the cut.
Iowa also placed in the semi-finals for the first time since 1995; this was also only their third placement in this history of the pageant.
Oklahoma and North Dakota both placed for the first time since 1997.
This was only the second time that the winner of Miss Congeniality also won the Miss Teen USA title.  Previously, Vanessa Minnillo won both titles in 1998.
This was the first time that the winners of both the Miss Congeniality and Miss Photogenic awards both placed in the top five.
Tami Farrell also competed in the Miss California USA pageant where she was 1st runner up that was won by Carrie Prejean, last June 10, 2009. She became Miss California USA 2009 after Executive director Keith Lewis fired previous Miss California USA Carrie Prejean from the position after accusations of Carrie repeatedly breaching her contract."...after our press conference in New York we had hoped we would be able to forge a better working relationship..." "...it has become abundantly clear that Carrie was unwilling to fulfill her obligations under our contract and work together" said Lewis.

Judges
Kyle Brandt
Tricia Helfer
Nick Lachey
Derek Parra
Betsy Rogers
Brittany Snow

References

External links
Official website

2003
2003 beauty pageants
2003 in the United States
2003 in California